was a Japanese singer-songwriter, from Tokyo.

Background
She was 20 years old when a friend's death inspired her first album. All of her albums keep to tragic or morbid themes.
She ended her career as musician in 1983, after giving a final concert in Tokyo. During her career as a musician she was exceptionally secretive, she wore sunglasses and used her curly hair to hide her face.

In the 1993 TV drama Kou Kou Kyoushi (a.k.a. High School Teacher) as well as in the 2003 TV drama Kou Kou Kyoushi 2003 (a.k.a. High School Teacher 2003), the song Bokutachi no Shippai from the second album Mother Sky was used as the theme song. 
As a result, the greatest hits album Bokutachi No Shippai was released.
She married Maeda Ado who used to be her illustrator manager. Maeda Ado died 2010, 8 years before Doji.

Death
Doji Morita died of heart failure on April 24, 2018 at the age of 65.

Discography
Good Bye グットバイ (1975)
 早春にて (In Early Spring)
 君は変わっちゃったネ (You Have Changed)
 まぶしい夏 (Dazzling Summer)
 雨のクロール (Rainy Crawl)
 地平線 (Horizon)
 センチメンタル通り (Sentimental Street)
 淋しい雲 (Lonely Clouds)
 たんごの節句 (Tango no sekku The Boys' Festival)
 驟雨（にわかあめ）(A Brief Shower)
 さよならぼくのともだち (Good Bye My Friend)

Mother Sky  マザー・スカイ=きみは悲しみの青い空をひとりで飛べるか= (1976)
 ぼくたちの失敗 (Our Mistake)
 ぼくと観光バスに乗ってみませんか (Will You Ride the Sightseeing Bus With Me)
 伝書鳩 (Carrier Pigeon)
 逆光線 (Back Light)
 ピラビタール (Pirabital Mesmerism medicinel)
 海を見たいと思った (I Wanted to See the Ocean, I Thought)
 男のくせに泣いてくれた (Though a Man, He Wept For Me)
 ニューヨークからの手紙 (Letter from NY)
 春爛漫 (Best Spring)
 今日は奇蹟の朝です (Today, Morning of Miracles)

A Boy ア・ボーイ (1977)
 蒼き夜は(Blue Night)
 君と淋しい風になる (With You I Become a Lonely Wind)
 ふるえているネ (You're Trembling)
 ぼくを見かけませんでしたか (Didn't You See Me?)
 セルロイドの少女 (Celluloid Girl)
 淋しい素描 (A Lonely Rough Sketch)
 ぼくが君の思い出になってあげよう (I Will Be a Memory For You)
 G線上にひとり (In G Line)
 終曲のために第3番 「友への手紙」 (No. 3 for Finale ' Letter for my friend')

Live in St. Mary's Cathedral, Tokyo 	 東京カテドラル聖マリア大聖堂録音盤 (1978)
The Last Waltz ラスト・ワルツ (1980)
 赤いダウンパーカーぼくのともだち (My Friend in the Red Down Parka)
 菜の花あかり(Rape Blossom Light)
 海が死んでもいいョって鳴いている  (The Sea Says I May Die)
 グリーン大佐答えて下さい (Please Answer, Colonel Green)
 みんな夢でありました (It Was All a Dream)
 きれいに咲いた (It Blossomed Beautifully)
 たとえばぼくが死んだら (If I Should Die)
 ラスト・ワルツ (Last Waltz)
Nocturne 夜想曲（やそうきょく） (1982)

 蒸留反応
 淋しい猫 (Lonely Cat)
 ぼくは16角形
 麗子像 (Image of a Fawn)
 サナトリウム (Sanatorium)
 船がくるぞ (The Ship Is Coming)
 孤立無援の唄 
 哀悼夜曲
 ラスト・ワルツ/『ラスト・ワルツ』(1980年、5th）収録の同一曲とバックのトラックは一緒で、ヴォーカルが再録音。 (Last Waltz)

Wolf Boy 狼少年 (1983)
 愛情練習（ロシアン・ルーレット） (Practice of love 'Russian Roulette')
 ぼくを見つけてくれないかなァ (Can't you find me?)
 ぼくは流星になる (I become a shooting star)
 151680時間の夢 (151680 Hour Dream)
 球根栽培の唄（ときわ荘にて録音）(Song Of Bulb Cultivation)
 ぼくのせいですか (Is It Because of Me?)
 憂鬱デス (Melancholy)
 狼少年・ウルフボーイ (Wolf Boy)

Other
Bokutachi No Shippai – Morita Doji Best Collection (1993)
Bokutachi No Shippai – Morita Doji Best Collection (2003)

References

External links 
http://www.gogorocket.jp/doji/h/
A review of "Mother Sky": https://web.archive.org/web/20081012043027/http://www.jrawk.com/Content/D/dojimorita/reviews/mothersky.html

1953 births
2018 deaths
Japanese folk singers
Japanese women singer-songwriters
Singers from Tokyo
Psychedelic folk musicians
20th-century Japanese women singers
20th-century Japanese singers